Rosegarden is a free software digital audio workstation program developed for Linux with ALSA and Qt4. It acts as an audio and MIDI sequencer, scorewriter and musical composition and editing tool. It is intended to be a free alternative to such applications as Cubase.

Software synthesizer is available as a plugin, and it is possible to use external MIDI synthesizer, hardware or software (such as FluidSynth or TiMidity++) in order to make any sound from MIDI compositions. Recent versions of Rosegarden support the DSSI software synthesizer plugin interface, and can use some Windows VST plugins through an adapter.

History 
The current Rosegarden program was originally named Rosegarden-4, to distinguish it from a previous program by the same authors called Rosegarden 2.1, which is now known as X11 Rosegarden. X11 Rosegarden is very limited, but is stable on a wide variety of Unix-like operating systems and other platforms such as OpenVMS. In contrast, because Rosegarden(-4) uses the Linux ALSA system, it only runs in a very limited manner on non-Linux systems.

The Rosegarden project was started in 1993 at the University of Bath. Rosegarden 2.1 (X11 Rosegarden) was released under the GPL in 1997; Rosegarden(-4) began in April 2000. Version 1.0 was released on February 14, 2005, and version 1.2.4 on July 14, 2006. In 2010, The version numbering was changed to reflect the release year, starting with 10.02.

Developers 
Rosegarden was developed up through 1.0 by Chris Cannam, Richard Bown and Guillaume Laurent. Since then, each release has been developed by a different mix of core and contributing project members, including, but not limited to D. Michael McIntyre, Pedro Lopez-Cabanillas, and Heikki Junes. Bown has retired from the project, while Laurent has left to pursue his interest in porting to Mac OS X via Cocoa in an as yet unnamed spinoff project.

Features
MIDI and audio playback and recording with ALSA and JACK
Piano-roll, score, event list and track overview editors
DSSI synth and audio effects plugin support, including Windows VST effects and instrument support via dssi-vst
LADSPA audio effects plugin support
JACK transport support for synchronisation with other software
Ability to build and run without JACK, for MIDI-only use
Score interpretation of performance MIDI data
Shareable device (.rgd) files to ease MIDI portability
Triggered segments for pattern sequencing & performable ornaments
Audio and MIDI mixers
MIDI and Hydrogen file import
MIDI, Csound, LilyPond and MusicXML file export (including PostScript and PDF output file generation of score)
User interface translations for Russian, Spanish, German, French, Welsh, Italian, Swedish, Estonian, Japanese, Simplified Chinese, Dutch, Polish, Czech, Catalan, and Finnish, as well as UK and US English
Help documentation available substantially or entirely translated into German, Swedish and Japanese as well as English

See also

Free audio software
Linux audio software
GNU LilyPond
MusE
MuseScore
Hydrogen
Ardour
NoteEdit
List of music software

References

External links

Audio software with JACK support
Digital audio workstation software
Free audio editors
Free audio software
Free music software
Free software programmed in C++
KDE
KDE software
Scorewriters
Audio editing software that uses Qt
Scorewriters for Linux